Flat Islands may refer to:

 Flat Islands (Antarctica)
 Flat Islands, Bonavista Bay, Newfoundland and Labrador
 Flat Islands, Placentia Bay, Newfoundland and Labrador

See also
 Flat Island (disambiguation)
 Flat Isles
 Flat Islet, Queensland